Parliamentary elections were held in Egypt on 28 October 1976, with a second round in four constituencies on 4 November. While the Arab Socialist Union remained the sole legal party in the country, as in previous elections, these elections were unique in having three distinct political factions of the party compete against each other (the right-wing Socialist Liberal Organisation, the centrist Arab Socialist Organisation and the left-wing National Progressive Unionist Party), along with 208 independents. This electoral experiment would lead, in 1979, to Egypt's first multi-party elections since 1952.

Two candidates were elected from each of the 175 constituencies, with a second round of voting required if one or both of the candidates failed to win over 50% of the vote in the first round, or neither of the candidates with over 50% were classed as a worker or farmer (each constituency had to have at least one farmer or worker representing it). Following the election, a further ten members were appointed by the President.

The result was a victory for the Arab Socialist Organisation, which won 295 of the 360 seats. Voter turnout was just 39.77%.

Results

References

Egypt
Parliamentary
Election and referendum articles with incomplete results
Elections in Egypt
Egypt